Dirce Navarro De Camargo (1913 - 20 April 2013) was a Brazilian billionaire businesswoman and the richest woman in Brazil, with a net worth of $13.8 billion when she died.

Her husband, Sebastião Camargo, who died in 1994, founded the privately traded Brazilian conglomerate Camargo Corrêa. Dirce Camargo was chairman from 1994 to 1996, and was a major shareholder.

Camargo died on 20 April 2013, aged 100. Bloomberg reported in 2013 that her three daughters, Regina de Camargo Pires Oliveira Dias, Renata de Camargo Nascimento and Rosana Camargo de Arruda Botelho were "poised to inherit the family fortune", as each holds an equal share of the holding company.

References

1913 births
2013 deaths
Brazilian billionaires
Brazilian businesspeople
Brazilian centenarians
Female billionaires
Mover Participações
Women centenarians